George Ford (January 11, 1846 – August 30, 1917) was an American lawyer and politician who served one term as a U.S. Representative from Indiana from 1885 to 1887.

Biography 
Born in South Bend, St. Joseph County, Indiana, Ford attended the common schools.
He engaged in the cooper's trade in early youth.
He entered the law department of the University of Michigan at Ann Arbor, and was graduated from that institution in 1869.
He was immediately admitted to the bar and commenced practice in South Bend.

He served as prosecuting attorney of St. Joseph County in 1873 and 1875-1884.

Congress 
Ford was elected as a Democrat to the Forty-ninth Congress (March 4, 1885 – March 3, 1887).
He declined to be a candidate for reelection in 1886 to the Fiftieth Congress.

Later career and death 
He became the head of the legal department of an implement concern, but subsequently resumed the private practice of his profession in South Bend.

Ford was elected judge of the superior court of St. Joseph County in 1914.

He died in South Bend, on August 30, 1917.
He was interred in Riverview Cemetery.

References

1846 births
1917 deaths
Indiana lawyers
Politicians from South Bend, Indiana
University of Michigan Law School alumni
Democratic Party members of the United States House of Representatives from Indiana
19th-century American politicians
19th-century American lawyers